Alassane També (born 26 January 1992) is a French professional footballer who plays as a right-back and centre-back.

Club career

Early career
També started playing football in the streets of Villepinte, a city in the Île-de-France region. After playing for local side Villepinte FC, he joined Paris Saint-Germain (PSG) in 2002. In the Paris Saint-Germain Academy, he established himself as a leader of his generation, being a captain from under-11 to under-17 level, while having teammates such as Chris Mavinga, Loïck Landre and Gianelli Imbula.

Paris Saint-Germain
During the 2008–09 season, També signed a three-year professional deal with PSG, and became at the time the youngest player to sign a professional contract for the club. També said "It means a lot for me to sign my first contract with Paris Saint-Germain. It's also great that the club is looking after their youth players. To sign at just 17 years of age a pro contract is simply fantastic, my dream came true but it's only the start for me. I have to keep on working and continue my development." Across three seasons, També went on to make 44 appearances for Paris Saint-Germain's reserve side in the Championnat de France Amateur (CFA). He never made a professional appearance for the club's first team.

Kortrijk
In January 2012, També signed for Belgian club Kortrijk. He made his debut for the club on 4 February 2012. També played and started most of the games during the second half of the 2011–12 season, helping his to reach the 2012 Belgian Cup Final against Lokeren, where they lost 1–0 at the King Baudouin Stadium.

Genoa and Tondela
In February 2015, També signed a four-and-a-half year deal with Genoa. On 13 July 2016, he joined Primeira Liga team Tondela on a one-year deal.

Honours 
Paris Saint-Germain U19

 Championnat National U19: 2010–11

Kortrijk

 Belgian Cup runner-up: 2011–12

References

External links

1992 births
Living people
French footballers
French sportspeople of Malian descent
Association football central defenders
Association football fullbacks
Paris Saint-Germain F.C. players
K.V. Kortrijk players
Royal Antwerp F.C. players
Genoa C.F.C. players
C.D. Tondela players
FCM Aubervilliers players
UE Sant Julià players
Football Club 93 Bobigny-Bagnolet-Gagny players
Championnat National 2 players
Belgian Pro League players
Challenger Pro League players
Serie A players
Primeira Liga players
Championnat National 3 players
French expatriate footballers
Expatriate footballers in Belgium
Expatriate footballers in Italy
Expatriate footballers in Portugal
Expatriate footballers in Andorra
French expatriate sportspeople in Belgium
French expatriate sportspeople in Italy
French expatriate sportspeople in Portugal
French expatriate sportspeople in Andorra